is a railway station in the city of Fuji, Shizuoka Prefecture, Japan, operated by the private railway operator Gakunan Railway.

Lines

Station layout
Hon-Yoshiwara Station has one island platform connected to street by a level crossing. There is no station building and the station is unattended.

Adjacent stations

Station history
It was renamed to its present name on April 10, 1956. It has been unmanned since 1993.

Passenger statistics
In fiscal 2017, the station was used by an average of 353 passengers daily (boarding passengers only).

Surrounding area
 Gakunan Electric Train Company head office
 Yoshiwara No.1 Junior High School
 Imaizumi Elementary School

See also
 List of Railway Stations in Japan

References

External links

 Gakunan Electric Train official website 

Railway stations in Shizuoka Prefecture
Railway stations in Japan opened in 1950
Fuji, Shizuoka